The Chloroflexota are a phylum of bacteria containing isolates with a diversity of phenotypes, including members that are aerobic thermophiles, which use oxygen and grow well in high temperatures; anoxygenic phototrophs, which use light for photosynthesis (green non-sulfur bacteria); and anaerobic halorespirers, which uses halogenated organics (such as the toxic chlorinated ethenes and polychlorinated biphenyls) as electron acceptors.

The members of the phylum Chloroflexota are monoderms (that is, have one cell membrane with no outer membrane), but they stain mostly gram-negative. Many well-studied phyla of bacteria are diderms and stain gram-negative, whereas well-known monoderms that stain Gram-positive include Firmicutes (or Bacillota) (low G+C gram-positives), Actinomycetota (high-G+C gram-positives) and Deinococcota (gram-positive diderms with thick peptidoglycan).

History

The taxon name was created in the 2001 edition of Volume 1 of Bergey's Manual of Systematic Bacteriology and is the Latin plural of the name Chloroflexus, the name of the type genus of the phylum, a common practice.

In 1987, Carl Woese, regarded as one of the forerunner of the molecular phylogeny revolution, divided Eubacteria into 11 divisions based on 16S ribosomal RNA (SSU) sequences and grouped the genera Chloroflexus, Herpetosiphon and Thermomicrobium into the "green non-sulfur bacteria and relatives", which was temporarily renamed as "Chloroflexi" in Volume One of Bergey's Manual of Systematic Bacteriology.

Chloroflexota being a deep branching phylum (see Bacterial phyla), it was considered in Volume One of Bergey's Manual of Systematic Bacteriology to include a single class with the same name. Since 2001, however, new classes have been created thanks to newly discovered species, and the phylum Chloroflexi is now divided into several classes.

"Dehalococcoidetes" is a placeholder name given by Hugenholtz & Stackebrandt, 2004, after "Dehalococcoides ethenogenes" a species partially described in 1997. The first species fully described was Dehalogenimonas lykanthroporepellens, by Moe et al. 2009, but in the description of that species the class was not made official nor were families or orders laid out as the two species share only 90% 16S ribosomal RNA identity, meaning that they could fall in different families or even orders.

Recent phylogenetic analysis of the Chloroflexota has found very weak support for the grouping together of the different classes currently part of the phylum. The six classes that make up the phylum did not consistently form a well-supported clade in phylogenetic trees based on concatenated sequences for large datasets of proteins, and no conserved signature indels were identified that were uniquely shared by the entire phylum. However, the classes Chloroflexi and Thermomicrobia were found to group together consistently by both the usual phylogenetic means and the identification of shared conserved signature indels in the 50S ribosomal protein L19 and the enzyme UDP-glucose 4-epimerase. It has been suggested that the phylum Chloroflexi sensu stricto should comprise only the classes Chloroflexi and Thermomicrobia, and the other four classes ("Dehalococcoidetes," Anaerolineae, Caldilineae and Ktedonobacteria) may represent one or more independent phyla branching in the neighborhood of the Chloroflexi.

Phylogeny
The currently accepted taxonomy is based on the List of Prokaryotic names with Standing in Nomenclature (LPSN) and National Center for Biotechnology Information (NCBI).

Taxonomy
Genus "Candidatus Chlorotrichoides" corrig. Oren et al. 2020 ["Candidatus Chlorothrix" Klappenbach & Pierson 2004 non Dyar 1921 non Berger-Perrot 1982]
Genus "Candidatus Nitrocaldera" Spieck et al. 2020
Genus "Candidatus Nitrotheca" Spieck et al. 2020
Class "Limnocylindria" Mehrshad et al. 2018
Order "Limnocylindrales" Mehrshad et al. 2018
Family "Limnocylindraceae" Mehrshad et al. 2018 (SL56)
Genus "Candidatus Aquidulcis" corrig. Rodriguez-R et al. 2020
Genus "Candidatus Limnocylindrus" Mehrshad et al. 2018
Class Ktedonobacteria Cavaletti et al. 2007 emend. Yabe et al. 2010
Order Thermogemmatisporales Yabe et al. 2011
Family Thermogemmatisporaceae Yabe et al. 2011
Genus Thermogemmatispora Yabe et al. 2011
Order Ktedonobacterales Cavaletti et al. 2007
Family Dictyobacteraceae Wang et al. 2019
Genus Dictyobacter Yabe et al. 2017
Genus Tengunoibacter Wang et al. 2019
Family Ktedonobacteriaceae Cavaletti et al. 2007
Genus Ktedonobacter corrig. Cavaletti et al. 2007
Genus Ktedonospora Yabe et al. 2021
Family Ktedonosporobacteraceae Yan et al. 2020
Genus Ktedonosporobacter Yan et al. 2020
Family Reticulibacteraceae Yabe et al. 2021
Genus Reticulibacter Yabe et al. 2021
Family Thermosporotrichaceae Yabe et al. 2010
Genus Thermosporothrix Yabe et al. 2010
Class "Umbricyclopia" Mehrshad et al. 2018
Order "Umbricyclopales" Mehrshad et al. 2018
Family "Umbricyclopaceae" Mehrshad et al. 2018
Genus "Candidatus Umbricyclops" Mehrshad et al. 2018 (TK10)
Class "Bathosphaeria" Mehrshad et al. 2018
Order "Bathosphaerales" Mehrshad et al. 2018
Family "Bathosphaeraceae" Mehrshad et al. 2018
Genus "Candidatus Bathosphaera" Mehrshad et al. 2018 (JG30-KF-CM66)
Class Tepidiformia Kochetkova et al. 2020
Order Tepidiformales Kochetkova et al. 2020
Family Tepidiformaceae Kochetkova et al. 2020
Genus "Tepidiforma Kochetkova et al. 2020
Class Dehalococcoidia Löffler et al. 2013
Order Dehalococcoidales Löffler et al. 2013
Family Dehalococcoidaceae Löffler et al. 2013
Genus Dehalococcoides Löffler et al. 2013
Genus Dehalogenimonas Moe et al. 2009
Class "Thermofontia" corrig. Ward et al. 2018
Order "Phototrophicales" Zheng et al. 2022
Family "Phototrophicaceae" Zheng et al. 2022
Genus "Phototrophicus" Zheng et al. 2022
Class Ardenticatenia Kawaichi et al. 2013
Order Ardenticatenales Kawaichi et al. 2013
Family Ardenticatenaceae Kawaichi et al. 2013
Genus Ardenticatena Kawaichi et al. 2013
Class "Caldilineia" Oren, Parte & Garrity 2016 ex Cavalier-Smith 2020
Order Caldilineales Yamada et al. 2006
Family "Amarolineaceae" Andersen et al. 2019
Genus "Candidatus Amarolinea" Andersen et al. 2019
Family Caldilineaceae Yamada et al. 2006
Genus Caldilinea Sekiguchi et al. 2003
Genus Litorilinea Kale et al. 2013
Class Thermoflexia Dodsworth et al. 2014
Order Thermoflexales Dodsworth et al. 2014
Family Thermoflexaceae Dodsworth et al. 2014
Genus "Candidatus Roseilinea" Thiel et al. 2016
Genus Thermoflexus Dodsworth et al. 2014
Class "Anaerolineia" Oren, Parte & Garrity 2016
Family "Profundisolitariaceae" Mehrshad et al. 2018
Genus "Candidatus Profundisolitarius" Mehrshad et al. 2018 (CL500-11)
Order "Promineifilales" 
Family "Promineifilaceae" 
Genus "Candidatus Promineofilum" McIlroy et al. 2016
Order Aggregatilineales Nakahara et al. 2019
Family Aggregatilineaceae Nakahara et al. 2019
Genus Aggregatilinea Nakahara et al. 2019
Order Anaerolineales Yamada et al. 2006
Family Anaerolineaceae Yamada et al. 2006
Genus Anaerolinea Sekiguchi et al. 2003 emend. Yamada et al. 2006
Genus Bellilinea Yamada et al. 2007
Genus "Brevefilum" McIlroy et al. 2017
Genus "Candidatus Denitrolinea" Okubo et al. 2021
Genus "Desulfolinea" Van Vliet et al. 2020
Genus Flexilinea Sun et al. 2015
Genus Levilinea Yamada et al. 2006
Genus Leptolinea Yamada et al. 2006
Genus Longilinea Yamada et al. 2007
Genus Ornatilinea Podosokorskaya et al. 2013
Genus Pelolinea Imachi et al. 2014
Genus Thermomarinilinea Nunoura et al. 2013
Genus "Thermanaerothrix" Gregoire et al. 2011
Genus "Candidatus" Villigracilis Nierychlo et al. 2019
Class Thermomicrobiia Oren, Parte & Garrity 2016
Order Sphaerobacterales Stackebrandt, Rainey & Ward-Rainey 1997
Family Sphaerobacteraceae Stackebrandt, Rainey & Ward-Rainey 1997
Genus Nitrolancea Sorokin et al. 2014 ["Nitrolancetus" Sorokin et al. 2012]
Genus Sphaerobacter Demharter et al. 1989
Order Thermomicrobiales Garrity & Holt 2002
Family Thermomicrobiaceae Garrity & Holt 2002
Genus Thermomicrobium Jackson, Ramaley & Meinschein 1973
Genus Thermorudis King & King 2014
Class Chloroflexia Gupta et al. 2013
Genus "Dehalobium" Wu et al. 2002
Genus "Candidatus Lithoflexus" Saghai et al. 2020
Genus "Candidatus Sarcinithrix" Nierychlo et al. 2019
Order "Thermobaculales" 
Family "Thermobaculaceae" 
Genus "Thermobaculum" Botero et al. 2004
Order Kallotenuales Cole et al. 2013
Family Kallotenuaceae Cole et al. 2013
Genus Kallotenue Cole et al. 2013
Order Herpetosiphonales Gupta et al. 2013
Family Herpetosiphonaceae Gupta et al. 2013
Genus "Candidatus Anthektikosiphon" Ward, Fischer & McGlynn 2020
Genus Herpetosiphon Holt & Lewin 1968 [Flavilitoribacter García-López et al. 2020]
Order Chloroflexales Gupta et al. 2013
Suborder Roseiflexineae Gupta et al. 2013
Family Roseiflexaceae Gupta et al. 2013 ["Kouleotrichaceae" Mehrshad et al. 2018]
Genus "Kouleothrix" Kohno et al. 2002
Genus Heliothrix Pierson et al. 1986
Genus Roseiflexus Hanada et al. 2002
Suborder Chloroflexineae Gupta et al. 2013
Family Chloroflexaceae Gupta et al. 2013
Genus Candidatus Chloranaerofilum Thiel et al. 2016
Genus Chloroflexus Pierson & Castenholz 1974 ["Chlorocrinis"]
Family Oscillochloridaceae Gupta et al. 2013
Genus Candidatus Chloroploca Gorlenko et al. 2014
Genus Chloronema ♪ Dubinina & Gorlenko 1975
Genus Oscillochloris Gorlenko & Pivovarova 1989
Genus Candidatus Viridilinea Grouzdev et al. 2018

Etymology
The name Chloroflexi is a Neolatin nominative case masculine plural of Chloroflexus, which is the name of the first genus described. The noun is a combination of the Greek adjective chloros, -a, on (χλωρός, -ά, -όν), meaning "greenish-yellow," and the Latin masculine passive perfect participle flexus (of flecto), meaning "bent." The etymology is unrelated to chlorine, an element that was discovered in 1810 by Sir Humphry Davy and named after its pale green colour. Another phylum with the same root is Chlorobiota, whereas "Cyanobacteria" has the root cyanos (κύανος), meaning "blue-green."

Unlike some other phyla, there is no theme root in the name of genera of Chloroflexota, and in fact many genera beginning with "Chloro-" or ending in "-chloris"'' are either cyanobacteria or chlorobi.

References

Phototrophic bacteria
Bacteria phyla
Chloroflexota